Baeckea exserta is a species of flowering plant in the family Myrtaceae and is endemic to the south-west of Western Australia.

The species was first formally described in 1920 by Spencer Le Marchant Moore in the Journal of the Linnean Society, Botany from specimens collected by Frederick Stoward near Bruce Rock. The specific epithet (exserta) means "protruding", referring to the stamens.

This baeckea grows in sandy clay in the Avon Wheatbelt bioregion in the south-west of Western Australia. It is listed as "Priority Three" by the Government of Western Australia Department of Biodiversity, Conservation and Attractions, meaning that it is poorly known and known from only a few locations but is not under imminent threat.

References

Flora of Western Australia
exserta
Plants described in 1920
Taxa named by Spencer Le Marchant Moore